Ardsley Union Free School District (AUFSD) is a school district headquartered in Ardsley, New York.

 Ryan Schoenfeld is the superintendent. The district has three schools: Concord Road School (grades K-4), Ardsley Middle School (grades 5–8), and Ardsley High School (grades 9–12).

In 2018 it had about 2,000 students.

History

Circa 2003 Lauren Allan, who attended AFUSD schools, began working as an administrator in the district, and she later became its superintendent. In 2018 Allan resigned. She was replaced by Ryan Schoenfeld, previously employed by the Amherst Central School District.

References

External links
 Ardsley Union Free School District

School districts in Westchester County, New York